Neiderhurst is a historic estate located at Palisades in Rockland County, New York.  The main estate house was built as a summer home between 1872 and 1874 in the High Victorian Gothic style.  It is a two-story, "L" shaped residence surmounted by steep gable roofs.  It was built by Winthrop S. Gilman, Jr. (1839–1923), son of Winthrop Sargent Gilman (1808–1884). Also on the property are a small observatory converted to a cote; Fern Lodge, built 1866, a residential outbuilding that was formerly the stables; a barn converted to residential use; a concrete pergola; and stone shed.  The estate grounds retain a park-like quality.

It was listed on the National Register of Historic Places in 1990.

References

Houses on the National Register of Historic Places in New York (state)
Gothic Revival architecture in New York (state)
Houses completed in 1874
Houses in Rockland County, New York
National Register of Historic Places in Rockland County, New York